A total solar eclipse occurred on February 15, 1961. Totality was visible from France, Monaco, Italy, San Marino, SFR Yugoslavia (parts now belonging to Croatia, Bosnia and Herzegovina, Montenegro, Serbia and Kosovo, North Macedonia), Albania, Bulgaria including the capital city Sofia, Romania including the capital city Bucharest, and the Soviet Union (parts now belonging to Ukraine, Russia and Kazakhstan). The maximum eclipse was recorded near Novocherkassk (Russian SFSR).

This was the 51st of 55 umbral eclipses in Solar Saros 120.

Upcoming 4 umbral eclipses

52. 1979 February 26

53. 1997 March 9

54. 2015 March 20

55. 2033 March 30

In popular culture

The crucifixion scene in the 1961 film Barabbas was shot during this eclipse.

Related eclipses

Solar eclipses of 1961–1964

Saros 120

Metonic series

See also 
 List of solar eclipses visible from Russia
 List of solar eclipses visible from Ukraine

Notes

References

 Solar eclipse of February 15, 1961 in Russia

1961 02 15
1961 in science
1961 02 15
February 1961 events